The Wangenitzsee Hut is a mountain hut in Hohe Tauern National Park, in Carinthia, Austria. It is situated directly on the Wangenitzsee, the largest lake of the Schober group of the Eastern Alps. Depending on the weather, it opens in the middle of June and closes at the end of September.

History 
The first hut was built by the Moravia/Brno section of the German Alpine Club in 1927, but it was looted and burned down in 1947. In 1966, a new, larger building was opened. This building was a club hut of the  until 2009, when the Lienz Section of the Austrian Alpine Club took over.

Approaches 

Walking time of approximately 2.5 hours.
 Drive from Lienz over the Iselsberg Pass to the Raneralm parking ground. Finally, make the short descent to the Wangenitzsee Hut. Walking time of approximately 3.5 hours.
 Drive from Carinthia in the Möll valley to Mörtschach, and then through the Wangenitz Valley to the Wangenitzalm parking ground. From there, hike on trail no. 928 to the Wangenitzsee Hut. Ascent time of approximately 3.5 hours.

Nearby summits 

Nearby huts 

  – Lower Seescharte; walking time 2.5 hours
  – over the Kreuzseescharte and the Lower and Higher Gradenscharte; walking time 3.5 hours

References

External links 

 Official website

Mountain huts in the Alps
Mountain huts in Austria
Schober Group